Mangham may refer to:

 Mangham, Louisiana
 James Mangham, English footballer
 USS George Mangham (1854)